Persistence (209) is the third ship of the Endurance-class landing platform dock of the Republic of Singapore Navy.

Development 
The navy's intention to purchase the Endurance-class was revealed by former Defence Minister Dr. Tony Tan during his visit to Tuas Naval Base on 3 August 1996. These ships were to replace the five ex-United States Navy (USN) County-class LSTs, which were acquired by Singapore from the United States in the 1970s. ST Marine was awarded the government contract to design and build the four ships – a significant milestone for the local defence and shipbuilding industries given the scale and extensiveness of the programme.

Construction and career
She was laid down in 1998 and launched on 18 March 1999. She was commissioned on 7 April 2001 with the hull number 209.

RSS Persistence on 4 January 2005 joined RSS Endurance to Aceh in Indonesia to deliver emergency supplies and medical personnel to aid in the relief efforts after a tsunami. Persistence also featured later in support of the efforts finding Indonesia AirAsia Flight 8501.

On 12 February 2009, Minister of Defence Teo Chee Hean announced that Persistence would join other naval forces off the coast of Somalia for three months in 2009. Comprising an LST with two Super Puma helicopters on board, the Singapore Armed Forces Task Group has been conducting daily helicopter surveillance flights and sector patrols to deter and disrupt piracy activities. The ship worked with the multinational Combined Task Force 151 to protect shipping in the Gulf of Aden.

CARAT 2010 
RSS Vigilance, RSS Steadfast, RSS Persistence, MV Avatar, USNS Amelia Earhart, USS Russell, USS Chung-Hoon and USCGC Mellon participated in CARAT 2010.

Indonesia AirAsia Flight 8501 

In December 2014, Persistence was deployed in the search for Airasia Flight QZ8501 after it crashed into the Java Sea on 28 December 2014; along with the RSN ships Supreme, Valour, and Kallang, MV Swift Rescue, and two Lockheed C-130H Hercules.

Gallery

References

External links

Endurance-class landing platform docks
Ships built in Singapore
1999 ships